"Ultimate" is a song by American rapper Denzel Curry, released on June 9, 2015 as the lead single from his debut double EP 32 Zel/Planet Shrooms. Produced and co-written by Ronny J, it is considered Curry's breakout hit.

The song went viral in early 2016 when users of the video hosting service Vine began uploading various memes where the song's hook would play towards the end of the video. The meme would then spread into other websites, such as YouTube. It was used in some parts of the episodes of Feisty Films.

The official remix of the song, featuring American rapper Juicy J, appears on the remastered version of 32 Zel/Planet Shrooms. A music video for the remix was released on March 20, 2019.

Charts

Certifications

References

2015 singles
2015 songs
Denzel Curry songs
Internet memes introduced in 2016